Bates's tree toad (Nectophryne batesii)  is a species of toad in the family Bufonidae.  It is recorded in an area running from southern Cameroon to south-western Gabon through south-western Central African Republic to north-eastern Democratic Republic of the Congo; it presumably occurs in Equatorial Guinea and Congo, and perhaps in Nigeria, but has not yet been recorded there. Its common and specific names commemorate George Latimer Bates (1863–1940), an American naturalist who traveled in West Africa.

Its natural habitat is tropical moist lowland forests. It requires tall forest and is not found in heavily degraded habitats. They are terrestrial during the day, but move up in the vegetation at night. They breed in tree cavities containing water. It can be locally threatened by habitat loss.

References

Bates's tree toad
Amphibians of Cameroon
Amphibians of the Central African Republic
Amphibians of the Democratic Republic of the Congo
Amphibians of Gabon
Taxa named by George Albert Boulenger
Bates's tree toad
Taxonomy articles created by Polbot